Aurélien Diesse (born 16 October 1997 in Paris) is a French judoka.

He participated at the 2018 World Judo Championships, winning a medal.

References

External links
 

1997 births
Living people
French male judoka
Sportspeople from Paris
Judoka at the 2019 European Games
European Games medalists in judo
European Games bronze medalists for France
Competitors at the 2018 Mediterranean Games
21st-century French people